Vera is a village in the municipality of Verdal in Trøndelag county, Norway. Vera is also a parish covering the eastern part of Verdal municipality, with Vera Chapel located in this village.

References

Verdal
Villages in Trøndelag